Jews and Buddhism: Belief Amended, Faith Revealed (1999) is a documentary narrated by Sharon Stone that compiles interviews and archival footage of prominent Jewish, Buddhist, and Jewish-Buddhist personalities—including the Dalai Lama, David Ben-Gurion, Allen Ginsberg, Rabbi Allen Lew, Sylvia Boorstein, and many others—to explore the new phenomenon of American Jews who have been drawn to Buddhist tradition.

Summary
More than 30% of non-Asian Buddhists are Jews – and many have become leaders in the spiritual movement.

Beat poet Allen Ginsberg, who considered himself a non-theistic Jew, found solace in Eastern religion. A leader in the counterculture movement, Ginsberg explored Buddhist meditation and belief and expressed his spiritual discontent in his poetry. "Jerusalems hated walls, I couldn't get over the holy side and weep where I was supposed to by history," he wrote cynically about his trip to Israel in the poem "Angkor Wat", continuing, "Returning home at last, years later as prophesied, is this the way I'm supposed to feel?"

The film shows an archival television interview of Israel's first Prime Minister, David Ben-Gurion and his old friend, U Nu, the Buddhist former Prime Minister of Burma as they discuss religion. Before they begin, the Prime Minister from Burma blurts out, "How is your wife? How is Mrs. Ben-Gurion?" His question is full of genuine interest and sets the tone of their debate, what seems to be the understanding that their religious differences are trumped by something more important—their human connection.

See also

 Jewish Buddhists
 Nyanaponika Thera
 Secular Jews
 The Jew in the Lotus
 Vipassana movement

References

External links
The Jewish Channel's review of the film
PBS Cover Story about the film 
Distributor's page

You don't look Buddhist
A frank encounter between religious Jews and Tibetan Buddhists
 

Buddhism and Judaism
1999 documentary films
1999 films
American documentary films
Converts from Judaism
Documentary films about Buddhism
Documentary films about Jews and Judaism
Documentary films about religion in the United States
1990s English-language films
1990s American films